Daya District (Taiwanese:  Tāi-ngé) is a suburban district in Taichung, Taiwan.

Administrative divisions 
Shangya, Daya, Wenya, Sanhe, Erhe, Side, Xibao, Shangfeng, Dafeng, Yafeng, Yuanlin, Liubao, Xiushan, Hengshan and Zhongyi Village.

Native products 
 Job's Tears
 Wheat, the only place in Taiwan to grow wheat

Tourist attractions 
 Ching-Chuang-Kang Military Base
 Ever Spring Museum
 Maple Scenery of Daya
 Qian-Xing Hall
 Sanhe Park
 Yong-Xing Temple
 Zhangs' Residence of Xiushan
 Zhao Family's Pottery

Education 
 Taichung Japanese School

Notable natives
 Lulu Huang Lu Zi Yin, television host, singer and actress

References

External links 

  

Districts of Taichung